"Lost" is a song by American singer-songwriter Frank Ocean. It was released as the fourth single from his debut studio album Channel Orange (2012). The song was written by Ocean, Micah Otano, and Malay; with production handled by the latter.

The single has also been covered by American record production trio Major Lazer, featuring vocals from Danish singer MØ, along with English electro band Swiss Lips as well as covered by English singer-songwriter Jorja Smith.

Composition
"Lost" is an R&B and pop song set in common time at a straight-up pop tempo of 123 beats per minute. The song is in a G minor, with a chord progression of Gm−B♭maj7−E♭−B♭maj7 followed throughout, and Ocean's vocal spans from C4 to G5. According to The Quietus, "A bouncy indie-rock rhythm and chicken-scratch guitar propels a buoyant Frank, as he takes to the road in the hope of getting well and truly lost in sunny California. Flowing atop a narcotic bass melody and a trio of harmonising vocalists, the choruses eventually pan back for a coda of whistling synths and ELO-esque keys." The lyrical content of "Lost" describes the protagonist's relationship with a cocaine-cooking girlfriend. The song contains samples from the film Fear and Loathing in Las Vegas (1998).

Reception
"Lost" received high praise and acclaim among critics, complimenting Ocean's idiosyncratic style and pop sensibilities as well as Malay, the album's prominent producer. It is often referred to as a highlight on his debut studio album Channel Orange and is his most straightforward "pop" song.

"Lost" debuted at number 91 on the Australian Singles Chart on the chart issue dated for the week of October 17, 2012 and peaked at number 46. The song also peaked at numbers 38, 53, and 9 on the Danish Singles Chart, UK Singles Chart and UK R&B Chart respectively.

"Lost" achieved its greatest level of success in New Zealand. The song debuted on the New Zealand Singles Chart at number 32, peaking at number 5 three weeks later and becoming Ocean's first top-ten single. The song was eventually certified gold and subsequently platinum by the Recording Industry Association of New Zealand (RIANZ) in its fifth and ninth week on the chart, respectively.

In early 2022, the song gained a viral resurgence from the social media platform TikTok. The song was used in over 176,000 videos from the app.

Charts

Weekly charts

Year-end charts

Certifications

Release history

Major Lazer version

"Lost" is a song recorded by Major Lazer, featuring guest vocals from Danish singer MØ. She had previously worked with Major Lazer on "All My Love" and worldwide hit "Lean On" for Major Lazer's fourth studio album, Peace Is the Mission. It was released to Major Lazer's SoundCloud on July 20, 2015, where it currently has over one million plays, and was promoted extensively on Twitter. It serves as a cover or remake of Frank Ocean's 2012 Channel Orange single, "Lost", and features reggae-style grooves, an up-beat tempo, electronic percussion and meta-rastafarian synths. The lyrics remain unchanged from the original version of the song. A static video of the single's cover was uploaded to Major Lazer's YouTube channel on July 23, 2015.

Background
The song's release was originally hinted in May 2015 with the release of a 10-second preview snippet on Twitter. The song at that point was unfinished and the album and release date were still to be confirmed.

Following the eager anticipation of Ocean's new album, Boys Don't Cry, Major Lazer initially wanted to demonstrate their production credentials and hint the release of Ocean's album, which was expected to be released on July 20. It was also used to promote their latest studio album, Peace is the Mission, which was released on June 1, 2015.

MØ had previously collaborated with Major Lazer for the lead single in the album "Lean On", which ended up becoming a worldwide hit, reaching the top 10 in the US and topping the Billboard Dance/Electronic Songs chart. She also worked on "All My Love" as a writer along with Lorde and Ariana Grande. This prompted Major Lazer to once again collaborate with her on a new single, and they chose Frank Ocean's "Lost" due to personal preferences. Another single, featuring Belgian singer Selah Sue is currently being worked on and is rumored to appear on Major Lazer's next studio album.

The cover art for the song features a cartoon depiction of a circular enclosed maze, at the centre of which is a peace sign, referencing the song's title and Major Lazer's latest album.

Reception
The song was well received by music critics, however reviews from Frank Ocean fanatics generally favored the original version, and many claimed that the single isn't at the "same level of the majorly infectious Lean On". Lindsey Lanquist of The Edge Magazine gave a positive review of the song and stated that "the resulting cover is surprisingly great. Though we would expect MØ and Major Lazer’s electronic influences to sound jarring when paired with Ocean’s rap and R&B roots, "Lost" is upbeat enough for it to work. The artists have essentially reimagined the song, turning it into something new and wonderful." MØ's vocals were also praised by critics, with Matthew Meadow of YourEDM claiming that "for what it’s worth, MØ’s rendition of Frank’s vocals are oozing with sweet seduction; she absolutely nails it."

The song was also named as one of "the 5 biggest songs" for the week of (July 24, 2015) by Capital Xtra.

Live performances
MØ performed the song live at the Sziget Festival on August 13, 2015, without a backing track. She later performed the song at the GrapeFestival on August 15, 2015. On June 4, 2016, the song was issued for a live performance at the Orange Warsaw Festival.

References

External links 
 "This week's new tracks" by The Guardian

2012 singles
2012 songs
2015 singles
Def Jam Recordings singles
Frank Ocean songs
Major Lazer songs
MØ songs
Songs about drugs
Songs written by Frank Ocean
Songs written by Malay (record producer)